The women's 200 metres event at the 1973 Summer Universiade was held at the Central Lenin Stadium in Moscow on 18, 19 and 20 August.

Medalists

Results

Heats
Wind:Heat 1: +1.9 m/s, Heat 4: +0.8 m/s

Semifinals

Wind:Heat 1: 0.0 m/s, Heat 2: ? m/s

Final

Wind: +0.6 m/s

References

Athletics at the 1973 Summer Universiade
1973